The third edition of the European Short Course Championships was held in Complexo Desportivo do Jamor in Lisboa, Portugal, from 9 to 11 December 1999.

Medal table

Medal summary

Men's events

Women's events

References
Results on GBRSports.com

1999 in swimming
S
1999
S
Swimming competitions in Portugal
Sports competitions in Lisbon
1990s in Lisbon
December 1999 sports events in Europe